Lewis Anthony Wilson (born 19 February 1993) is an English footballer who plays for  side Banbury United, where he plays as a midfielder or forward.

Playing career
Wilson joined Rushden & Diamonds after a successful trial in 2009, after he had been spotted playing for Newport Pagnell Town. He started a two-year scholarship and was a regular in the youth team, scoring 16 goals in his first year. In his second year, Wilson featured twice for the first team in the Northamptonshire Senior Cup against Daventry United and Brackley Town. He also joined Newport Pagnell and Northampton Spencer on work-experience. In the summer of 2011, Wilson was released and rejoined UCL Premier side Newport Pagnell Town. He made his debut in August 2011, in a 3–0 defeat to Boston Town. In January 2012, Wilson joined Football League Two side Northampton Town on a contract until the end of the season, after impressing on a one-week trial. He made his debut for the Cobblers on 17 April 2012 in a 3–1 defeat to Crawley Town, coming on as a substitute for Jake Robinson. His first goal and start came in a 1–1 draw with Gillingham. On 30 April, Wilson signed a one-year professional contract. In November 2012, he joined Kettering Town on loan until 2 January 2013.

On 7 August 2018 it was confirmed that Wilson had joined Stratford Town from Cambridge City.

Wilson was confirmed as signing for Southern League Premier Division Central side Banbury United on 27 January 2020. Lewis made his debut on 1 February 2020, as his new side were narrowly beaten 1–0 at home to Bromsgrove Sporting.

References

External links

Newport Pagnell Town appearances at NPTFC
Lewis Wilson at Aylesbury United

1993 births
Living people
English footballers
Association football forwards
Rushden & Diamonds F.C. players
Newport Pagnell Town F.C. players
Northampton Spencer F.C. players
Northampton Town F.C. players
Kettering Town F.C. players
Bishop's Stortford F.C. players
Whitehawk F.C. players
Oxford City F.C. players
St Neots Town F.C. players
Cambridge City F.C. players
Stratford Town F.C. players
Banbury United F.C. players
English Football League players